Zerwikaptur is a Polish coat of arms. It was used by several gentry families in the times of the Polish–Lithuanian Commonwealth.

A legend about the origination of the coat of arms is used in the novel With Fire and Sword by Henryk Sienkiewicz, whereby a character Longinus Podbipięta managed to cut off the heads of three knights bearing the goat's head on their arms with a single swing of his huge sword. Therefore he named his sword "Zerwikaptur", literally meaning "coif-snapper", and later got the coat of arms of this name. In fact, Zerwikaptur originated well before the times of the novel.

See also
 Polish heraldry

External links 
  Zerwikaptur Coat of Arms & the bearers. 

Zerwikaptur